Was She Justified? is a 1922 British silent drama film directed by Walter West and starring Florence Turner, Ivy Close and Lewis Gilbert.

Cast
 Florence Turner as Joan Crossby  
 Ivy Close 
 Lewis Gilbert as John Crossby  
 Arthur Walcott as Robert Quidman  
 George Bellamy  
 Jeff Barlow 
 Gwen Dickens 
 John Reid 
 Leonard Upton

References

Bibliography
 Low, Rachael. The History of the British Film 1918-1929. George Allen & Unwin, 1971.

External links
 

1922 films
1922 drama films
British drama films
British silent feature films
Films directed by Walter West
Films set in England
British black-and-white films
British films based on plays
1920s English-language films
1920s British films
Silent drama films